Red River Valley is a 1941 American Western film about ranchers struggling to build a reservoir. It stars Roy Rogers, Gabby Hayes, and Gale Storm, and the director was Joseph Kane.

External links 

1941 films
Republic Pictures films
American black-and-white films
Films directed by Joseph Kane
1941 Western (genre) films
American Western (genre) films
1940s American films